Annapurna is a massif in the Himalayas, in north-central Nepal.

Annapurna or Annapoorna may also refer to:

Places
 Annapurna II, part of the Annapurna mountain range
 Annapurna III, a mountain in the Annapurna mountain range
 Annapurna IV, a mountain of the Annapurna range in the Himalayas
 Annapurna, Nepal, a village in Bhojpur District in the east of the country
 Annapurna Rural Municipality (disambiguation), Nepal
 Annapurna Sanctuary, a high glacial basin lying below the mountain range

Companies
 Annapurna Interactive, the video gaming arm of Annapurna Pictures
 Annapurna Labs, an Israel-based microelectronics company
 Annapurna Pictures, a U.S.-based film production company
 Annapurna Studios, an India-based film production company
 Annapurna Theatre, the pioneer of Oriya Theatre Company

Entertainment
 Annapurna (book), a 1951 story of the first recorded expedition to reach the summit
 Annapurna (film), Telugu language film
 Annapoorna (film), a 1964 Kannada language film
 Neem Annapurna, a 1979 Bengali film

People
 Annapurna (actress) (born 1948), Telugu film actress
 Annapurna Devi (Roshanara Khan, born 1927), Indian classical instrumentalist

Other
 Annapurna (goddess), the Hindu goddess of food and nourishment
 Annapurna FM, a Nepali radio station
 Annapurna Upanishad, a Sanskrit text and one of the minor Upanishads of Hinduism
 Annapoorna Gowrishankar, a South Indian restaurant chain
 Anapurna (horse) (born 2016), winner of the 2019 Epsom Oaks